Nam Tok railway station is a railway station located in Tha Sao Subdistrict, Sai Yok District, Kanchanaburi. Nam Tok is the current terminus for daily trains from Bangkok on the Death Railway line. However, an excursion train from Bangkok during the weekends continues to Nam Tok Sai Yok Noi Halt, a few kilometres from the station.

The station opened in July 1958 from Wang Pho railway station, as part of State Railway of Thailand's project in rebuilding the railway after the Second World War.

Train services 
 Ordinary 257/258 Thon Buri–Nam Tok–Thon Buri
 Ordinary 259/260 Thon Buri–Nam Tok–Thon Buri
 Local 485/486 Nong Pladuk–Nam Tok–Nong Pladuk

References 
 
 

Railway stations in Thailand
Buildings and structures in Kanchanaburi province
Railway stations opened in 1958